Weird Food and Devastation is the sixth studio album by the American pop-rock band the Connells, released on August 20, 1996.
It is the highly anticipated follow up album to the successful Ring album, which was released three years prior. The album is partly mixed by longtime R.E.M.-collaborator Scott Litt. The mastering was done by engineer Bob Ludwig.

Critical reception
The Washington Post wrote that "as usual, the overall effect is adept but underwhelming; Weird Food & Devastation should please the band's fans, but probably won't attract many new ones." The Houston Press called the album "dense, dark, somewhat grungy ... the strangest Connells effort to date."

Track listing
"Maybe" (Mike Connell) - 2:30
"Start" (Connell) - 4:06
"Fifth Fret" (Doug MacMillan) - 3:40
"Just Like That" (MacMillan) - 3:33
"Adjective Song" (Connell) - 2:27
"Any" (Peele Wimberley) - 3:25
"Hang On" (Connell) - 3:20
"Back To Blue" (Greg Kendall, MacMillan) - 3:09
"Smoke" (McMillan, Potak) - 4:23
"Pretty Rough" (Connell) - 3:52
"Let It Go" (Huntley) - 3:55
"Friendly Time" (MacMillan) - 2:42
"Too High" (MacMillan) - 3:13
"On Your Honor" (Huntley, MacMillan) - 3:33

Personnel 
The Connells
 Doug MacMillan - lead vocals
 Mike Connell - guitar, vocals, lead vocals on "Friendly Time"
 George Huntley - guitar, vocals, lead vocals on "Let it Go"
 Steve Potak - piano, organ, keyboards
 David Connell - bass
 Peele Wimberley - drums, percussion

Technical personnel
Tim Harper - producer, mixing, engineer
Scott Litt - mixing
Richard Dott - mixing
Dan Leffler - mixing assistant
James Bauer - mixing assistant 
Mark Williams - engineer
Robert Clark - second engineer 
Tracy Schroeder - second engineer
Brent Lambert - editing
Bob Ludwig - mastering
Greg Knoll - design
Axl Jansen - photography

References

1996 albums
The Connells albums
TVT Records albums